Alex Dominique Kristensen Vanopslagh (born 17 October 1991) is a French-born Danish politician. He is a member of the Folketing, and party leader of the Liberal Alliance. He is a former chairman of its youth wing, Liberal Alliance Youth.

Early life and education 
Alex Vanopslagh, who was born in Épernay, France, moved to Denmark when he was five, and grew up in Struer. In 2009 he moved to Herning and in 2011 he completed high school. He originally wanted to be a journalist, but applied and failed the entrance exam to the Danish Media and Journalism School in Aarhus after taking the wrong bus. He earned a bachelor's degree in political science from the University of Southern Denmark in Odense, and a master's degree from the University of Copenhagen in 2016.

Political career 
In 2014, he was elected leader of Liberal Alliance Youth, succeeding Rasmus Brygger. He was reelected in 2015 and did not stand for reelection in 2016. 

In autumn 2016, he was selected as lead candidate for the Liberal Alliance in the 2017 Copenhagen Municipality elections, and won a seat in the Copenhagen Municipal Council with 3,563 votes.

In the 2019 general election, Vanopslagh was elected to the Folketing representing West Jutland constituency. The election was catastrophic for the Liberal Alliance, which lost nine of thirteen seats and its leader Anders Samuelsen failing to be reelected. Following the defeat, Samuelsen resigned as leader of the party, and was succeeded by Vanopslagh.

Vanopslagh has been a prominent critic of Prime Minister Mette Frederiksen and her government, due to alleged attacks on fundamental institutions, rights and common sense. He has referred to Frederiksen as "the worst news for our democracy and justice state since World War II". During the mink case, Vanopslagh called for Frederiksen to resign and criticized the Social Liberal Party for supposedly letting Frederiksen off the hook.

Under Vanopslagh, the Liberal Alliance has seen a major rise in popularity, especially during campaigning for the 2022 Danish general election. Much of Vanopslagh's campaigning has occurred on social media, in particular TikTok; he has been referred to as "The King of TikTok". This campaigning is targeted primarily towards young voters, among whom Liberal Alliance is one of the most popular parties.

Vanopslagh led his party into the 2022 election, which resulted in a major victory. The party gained 10 new seats compared to the last election. In East Jutland Vanopslagh received 38,284 personal votes.

References

External links 
 Biography on the website of the Danish Parliament (Folketinget)

1991 births
Living people
People from Épernay
Liberal Alliance (Denmark) politicians
Members of the Folketing 2019–2022
Leaders of political parties in Denmark
21st-century Copenhagen City Council members
Members of the Folketing 2022–2026